Cyphostigma is a genus of plants. It contains only one accepted species, Cyphostigma pulchellum, endemic to Sri Lanka.

References

Alpinioideae
Zingiberaceae genera
Monotypic Zingiberales genera
Endemic flora of Sri Lanka